Lieutenant-Colonel Henry Edward Hamlyn-Fane (5 September 1817 – 27 December 1868), known as Henry Fane until 1861, was a British soldier and Conservative politician.

Background
Born Henry Fane, he was the eldest son of Reverend Edward Fane, son of Henry Fane, younger son of Thomas Fane, 8th Earl of Westmorland. His mother was Maria, daughter of Walter Parry Hodges. In 1861 he assumed by Royal licence the additional surname of Hamlyn, which was that of his father-in-law (see below).

Military and political career
Hamlyn-Fane was a Lieutenant-Colonel in the 4th Light Dragoons. In 1865 he was returned to Parliament for Hampshire South, a seat he held until November 1868.

Family
Hamlyn-Fane married Susan Hester, daughter of Sir James Hamlyn-Williams, 3rd Baronet, in 1850, through which marriage Clovelly court, Clovelly, Devon, came into the Fane family. They had two sons and four daughters. Hamlyn-Fane died at his country seat, Avon Tyrrell, Hampshire, in December 1868, aged 51. His wife only survived him by a few months and died at Clovelly Court in May 1869, aged 45.

See also
Earl of Westmorland

References

External links 
 

1817 births
1868 deaths
Conservative Party (UK) MPs for English constituencies
UK MPs 1865–1868
Light Dragoons officers
Henry
British Militia officers